John Sanford Posey (born February 7, 1956) is an American actor. With a long career in guest spots in episodes of various television series, he may be best known for his six appearances as Dr. Conrad Fenris in Teen Wolf (2011–2017), a show starring his son, Tyler Posey. He also had a recurring role as Judge Will Millstone in the first two seasons (2014–2015) of How to Get Away with Murder.

Life and career
He was born in Hartford, Connecticut, to Joan (Armstrong) and William McCutcheon Posey Jr. He is father of three children, including Tyler.

John Posey was chosen to play Danny Tanner on the television series Full House and was cast in the unaired pilot; however, he was replaced by Bob Saget for the series premiere.

Filmography

Film

Television

References

External links

1956 births
Living people
21st-century American male actors
American male television actors
American male film actors
Male actors from Hartford, Connecticut